Charles John Smith (19 January 1849 – 8 May 1930) was an English cricketer. A right round-arm fast bowler, and lower-order right-hand batsman, Smith made only ten first-class appearances for the Marylebone Cricket Club and for Middlesex between 1867 and 1878, spending the rest of his career in club cricket for Harrow School, Eton, and various Gentlemen's XIs representing England and the North of England. His brother, Arthur Smith, also played cricket for Middlesex.

Notes

External links
 
 

1849 births
1930 deaths
People educated at Harrow School
English cricketers
Middlesex cricketers
Marylebone Cricket Club cricketers
Gentlemen of the North cricketers
Gentlemen of England cricketers
Gentlemen of Marylebone Cricket Club cricketers